Time Will Tell is an album by pianist Paul Bley, bassist Barre Phillips, and saxophonist Evan Parker recorded in 1994 and released on the ECM label in 1995.

Reception 
The Penguin Guide to Jazz selected this album as part of its suggested Core Collection.

The Allmusic review by Scott Yanow awarded the album 2½ stars stating "This CD contains a series of mostly thoughtful free improvisations featuring three of the giants of the idiom... Although the results overall are not classic, the music never fails to hold on to one's interest as the three musicians continually think and evolve together".

Track listing
All compositions by Paul Bley, Evan Parker & Barre Phillips except as indicated
 "Poetic Justice" - 17:22
 "Time Will Tell" - 4:25
 "Above the Tree Line" - 4:49
 "You Will, Oscar, You Will" (Bley, Phillips) - 4:57
 "Sprung" - 5:22
 "No Questions" -  5:30
 "Vine Laces" (Parker, Phillips) - 4:04
 "Clawback" (Bley, Parker) - 3:15
 "Marsh Tides" - 5:43
 "Instance" (Parker, Phillips) - 4:26
 "Burlesque" - 7:15
Recorded at Rainbow Studio in Oslo, Norway in January 1994.

Personnel
 Paul Bley — piano
 Evan Parker — tenor saxophone, soprano saxophone
 Barre Phillips — bass

References

ECM Records albums
Paul Bley albums
1995 albums
Albums produced by Manfred Eicher